Chelsea Bremner (born 11 April 1995) is a New Zealand rugby union player. She plays for the Black Ferns internationally and was a member of their 2021 Rugby World Cup champion squad. She previously played for Matatū in 2022, but now plays for the Chiefs Manawa in the Super Rugby Aupiki competition. She represents Canterbury at a provincial level.

Personal life 
Bremner is a school teacher at Hornby High School, she also coaches the boys' rugby team. She began her sporting career in netball, and only took up rugby in 2015.

Rugby career

2019 
In 2019, she was named the Farah Palmer Cup Player of the Year. She was named in the New Zealand Development XV for the 2019 Oceania Rugby Women's Championship in Fiji, where she played in all three games.

2020 
Bremner and her younger sister, Alana have both played 50 games for Lincoln University in 2020. She was part of the Canterbury team that won their fourth consecutive Farah Palmer Cup title in 2020.

Bremner made her Black Ferns debut on 14 November 2020 against the New Zealand Barbarians at Waitakere. She earned her second cap in the second match against the Barbarians at Nelson.

2021–2022 
In November 2021, Bremner signed with Matatū for the inaugural season of Super Rugby Aupiki.

Bremner was named in the Black Ferns squad for the 2022 Pacific Four Series. She made her international debut against Australia on 6 June 2022 at Tauranga. She made the team again for a two-test series against the Wallaroos for the Laurie O'Reilly Cup in August.

Bremner was selected for the Black Ferns 2021 Rugby World Cup 32-player squad. She scored the opening try against Wales in their second pool game.

2023 
In 2023, She transferred from Matatū and signed with the Chiefs Manawa for the second year of the Super Rugby Aupiki competition. She scored her first try on her debut for Chiefs Manawa in their first round victory over Hurricanes Poua.

References

External links 

 Black Ferns Profile

1995 births
Living people
New Zealand female rugby union players
New Zealand women's international rugby union players